Countermeasure in public international law refers to reprisals not involving the use of force. In other words, it refers to non-violent acts which are illegal in themselves, but become legal when executed by one state in response to the commission of an earlier illegal act by another state towards the former.

Definition
The leading case on countermeasure is the 1997 International Court of Justice decision in Gabčíkovo – Nagymaros Dams case. The court remarked that, for a countermeasure to be justifiable, it must meet the conditions below:
 The act constituting countermeasure must be taken in response to a previous intentional wrongful act of another state and must be directed against that state.
 The injured state must have already called upon the state committing the wrongful act to discontinue its wrongful conduct or to make reparation, but the request was refused.
 The countermeasure must be commensurate with the injury suffered, taking into account the rights in question.
 The purpose behind evoking the countermeasure is to induce the wrongdoing state to comply with its obligations under international law. Therefore, the measure must be reversible.

State responsibility
Article 22 of the International Law Commission draft articles on state responsibility states that the wrongfulness of an act is precluded if the act constitutes a countermeasure. Therefore, a validly executed countermeasure is legal under international law.

References

International law